Ted Mestre was an American football coach.  He served as the second head football coach at the University of Wisconsin–Madison for a single season in 1890, compiling a record of 1–3. He was an alumnus of Yale University.

Head coaching record

References

Year of birth missing
Year of death missing
Wisconsin Badgers football coaches
Yale University alumni